Sauti za Busara (in Swahili: "Sounds of Wisdom") is an African music festival, held every year in February in Zanzibar, Tanzania. It is centred in the Old Fort (Ngome Kongwe), with fringe events taking place at the same time around Stone Town - including a carnival street parade (Beni).

Sauti za Busara has become one of the largest music festivals in East Africa, with several hundreds of artists participating each year. It showcases a diverse and dynamic programme of exclusively African music and has over the years provided a stage for local Swahili talent, from Taarab legends like Bi Kidude and Culture Musical Club, to homegrown Tanzanian pop and hip-hop.

The twelfth edition of the festival took place in 2015. However, the organisers have since announced their decision to cancel the 2016 edition due to shortage of funding. Despite the world-wide pandemic caused by Covid-19, the festival took place in February 2021.

See also 

 Music of Tanzania
 Taarab

References

Tourist attractions in Zanzibar
Music festivals in Tanzania
Music festivals in Africa